Ángel Francisco Maldonado (born September 8, 1973) is a Mexican former professional footballer. He played as a goalkeeper during his career. He was a member of the Mexico national team competing at the 1992 Summer Olympics in Barcelona, Spain.

References
playerhistory

1973 births
Living people
Mexico under-20 international footballers
Association football goalkeepers
Olympic footballers of Mexico
Footballers at the 1992 Summer Olympics
Club América footballers
Footballers from Sinaloa
Sportspeople from Los Mochis
Mexican footballers
Club Necaxa non-playing staff